Colonia Catinzaco is a municipality and village in La Rioja Province in northwestern Argentina.

References

Populated places in La Rioja Province, Argentina